Hostus is a monotypic genus of Malagasy lynx spiders containing the single species, Hostus paroculus. It was first described by Eugène Louis Simon in 1898, and is only found on Madagascar.

See also
 List of Oxyopidae species

References

Monotypic Araneomorphae genera
Oxyopidae
Spiders of Madagascar